Erik Oliver Sax (November 5, 1904 – March 21, 1982) was a Major League Baseball player. Sax played third base for the St. Louis Browns in the 1928 season. In 16 games, he had three hits in 17 at-bats, with four runs scored. Sax batted and threw right-handed.

He was born in Branford, Connecticut, and died in Newark, New Jersey.

External links

1904 births
1982 deaths
Baseball players from Connecticut
St. Louis Browns players
People from Branford, Connecticut